Carolina Loureiro (born in Pombal, Mata Mourisca, on June 23, 1992) is a Portuguese actress, model and presenter, best known for playing Nazaré Gomes in SIC's soap opera Nazaré.

Biography 
Carolina Loureiro lived until the age of 17 in the parish of Guia, Pombal. She is the daughter of a businessman and his wife is a kindergarten teacher, and her parents have been separated since she was 19 years old.

At the age of 17, she made her debut in the series "Morangos com Açúcar", playing the character Sara Reis, in 2011. In 2013, still on TVI, she joined the main cast of the soap opera Mundo ao Contrário. In 2014, she joined the cast of the soap opera O Beijo do Escorpião, also on TVI, as participation.

In 2015, she starred in the SIC Radical series Aposta Que Amas and currently plays “Nazaré Gomes” in the SIC soap opera Nazaré as the protagonist.

She was the presenter of SIC's Fama Show between 2016 and 2020.

Personal life 
She dated singer David Carreira from 2015 to 2017, having starred in his music video "Primeira Dama", "In Love", "Não Foi Eu" and "Diz Que É Só Comigo". She is currently dating Brazilian singer Vitor Kley.

Filmography

Television

References 

Portuguese television presenters
Portuguese actresses
Living people
21st-century Portuguese actresses
Portuguese female models

1992 births